Marko Balazic (born 31 July 1984 in Slovenia) is a Slovenian footballer who plays for USV St. Anna am Aigen in Austria.

Career

Balazic started his senior career with NK Mura in 2000. In 2011, he signed for Irtysh Pavlodar in the Kazakhstan Premier League, where he made fifteen appearances and scored zero goals. After that, he played for Slovenian club KMN Mladinec and Austrian club USV St. Anna am Aigen, where he plays now.

References

External links 
 Марко Балажич: «Мы помним 7:2…» 
 Марко Балажич: «Иртыш» выиграет»
 KMN Mladinec državni prvak, Marko Balažic naj igralec turnirja! 
 Negotov začetek priprav Nafte, Balažic v Turčiji 
 Balažic in Flisar na miniEURU 
 Nekateri nekdanji igralci Mure 05 sprožili arbitražo 
 Russian Wikipedia Page 
 NZS – Nogometna zveza Slovenije Profile 
 oefb.at Profile 
 Ravenska liga Profile

Living people
1984 births
NK Mura players
ND Mura 05 players
Slovenian footballers
FC Irtysh Pavlodar players
Expatriate footballers in Austria
Association football defenders
NK Nafta Lendava players
NK Drava Ptuj players
Slovenian expatriate footballers
Expatriate footballers in Kazakhstan